Smarden is a civil parish and village, west of Ashford in Kent, South East England.

The village has the Anglican parish church of St Michael the Archangel which, because of its high scissor beam roof, is sometimes known as "The Barn of Kent".

History
The earliest known date for Smarden is 1205, when Adam de Essex became the Rector of the parish. The area was covered by the forest of Anderida and when clearings were made, the River Beult (a tributary of the River Medway) formed the drainage channel.

There is now evidence for early iron smelting at a number of sites in the parish. The most noteworthy is at Romden where a field known as 'Black Pitts' was commented on in 1912.This area was investigated briefly in 1994 and later in 2008 with the assistance of members of the Smarden history group under the leadership of Neil Aldridge of the Kent Archaeological Society'
The features were recorded in more detail and included an area of waste slag from iron smelting together with Roman pottery sherds, ref: KCC Historic Environment Record and Wealden Iron Research Group database.
There are other sites which have produced iron working waste, some prehistoric, including one west of Cousins Farm which has been radio carbon dated to the 1st century BC. There have also been a number of finds of pre-historic flint implements including hand axes associated with the river gravels.

The local woollen industry was encouraged by King Edward III who brought weaver craftsmen over from Flanders to create what was to become one of England's biggest industries. Edward in recognition granted the village a Royal Charter in 1333 permitting them to hold a weekly market and an annual fair thus elevating the status from village to "Town". Elizabeth I, en route from Sissinghurst Castle to Boughton Malherbe in 1576, was so impressed by what she saw and ratified the previously granted Charter. A copy of the Charter hangs in the village church.

Houses

Smarden became very prosperous and some fine houses were built in the 15th and 16th centuries, many of which remain today. The Cloth Hall (1430) is an example of a fifteenth-century yeoman's timber hall house. Although built as a farm it became the central clearing warehouse for the local cloth industry; the broad-cloth would have been taken from there to the port of Faversham.

Jubilee House on Pluckley Road is a Grade II listed house built c. 1772.

During the Second World War, houses in Smarden, such as Gilletts, were used to relocate evacuees from London.

Geography
The area is drained by the headwaters of the two major rivers ultimately flowing north, via Maidstone to the west or Ashford to the east.  These rivers are the River Medway and the River Stour however many of these headwaters are only seasonal.

Amenities
Smarden has a Butcher's shop, as well as the West End House Art 'Gallery' (shop and gallery). In 2019, Smarden's multi-purpose 'Post Office and Stores' closed. However, a new post office located near to the village hall has since opened, providing many of the same amenities as the previous shop in addition to zero-waste facilities. 

By the three main neighbourhoods are three mostly quite large, family-catering pubs: The Flying Horse, The Bell and The Chequers.  Smaller Maltmans Hill and Haffenden Quarter are well linked and remain tied to the founding neighbourhood which bears the same name as the civil parish.

Other amenities in the village include:
Parish Council, PCC (Parocial Church Council)
FOSC (Friend's of Smarden Church)
Charter Hall
WI
Meals On Wheels
Volunteer Car Scheme
Smarden Youth
Cricket
Football
Good Neighbour Scheme
Local History Society
Primary School
Royal British Legion
Pre School
Gardeners Society
Baby and Toddler Group
The Smarden Players)
Conservative Association

Demography
The population rose by 79 between 2001 and 2011, as reported in the latest census.

Past residents 
Author and artist Mervyn Peake lived in Smarden in 1950.

Dorothy Crisp (1906–1987), an English author, political writer, publisher, chairman of the British Housewives' League, lived here. She married John Becker in London in 1945, but retained her maiden name; they moved to the village and had two children.

British mountaineer and filmmaker, John Baptist Lucius Noel, lived in Cloth Hall and Hartnup House.

References

External links

Statistical civil parish overview - map

Villages in Kent
Villages in the Borough of Ashford
Civil parishes in Ashford, Kent